Petre Steinbach (January 1, 1906 in Timișoara, Romania – 1996 in Germany), was a Romanian football midfielder and manager.

Career
His career in club football was spent at CAM Timișoara between 1925 and 1928, also playing for Colțea Brașov in 1928–1929, then he moved to Unirea Tricolor București, where he spent 10 years, for a while as a player-coach. Steinbach finished his playing career in the 1939–1940 season at Olympia București. After World War II, Steinbach, because of his German origins was sent for a while to forced labour in the USSR, Joseph Stalin considering that German people doing forced labour was a way for the Germans to pay "war reparations". In 1947 he became coach at ITA Arad, helping the team win the second title in the club's history. Steinbach was also a writer, he wrote two volumes about football:
 Fotbalul nostru (Our football) (1937)
 Fotbalul se joacă râzând (Football is played with laughter) (1972)

International career
Petre Steinbach played 18 games at international level for Romania, making his debut under coach Constantin Rădulescu in a 5–3 away loss against Bulgaria at the 1929–31 Balkan Cup, a tournament in which he also played in the rematch, which ended with a 5–2 victory, in a 4–2 away victory against Yugoslavia and in a 4–2 away victory against Greece, helping Romania win the competition. He was also part of Romania's squad at the first World Cup, the 1930 edition. Steinbach played three games at the three games at the 1932 Balkan Cup. He also played three games at the 1931–1934 Central European Cup for Amateurs and two at the 1933 Balkan Cup, both tournaments being won by Romania.

Honours

Player
Unirea Tricolor București
Divizia B (1): 1938–39
Cupa României runner-up (1): 1935–36
Romania
Balkan Cup (2): 1929–31, 1933
Central European International Cup (1): 1931–34

Manager
Unirea Tricolor București
Divizia B (1): 1938–39
Cupa României runner-up (1): 1935–36
ITA Arad
Divizia A (1): 1947–48

References

External links

Petre Steinbach manager profile at Labtof.ro

1906 births
1996 deaths
Sportspeople from Timișoara
People from the Kingdom of Hungary
Romanian footballers
Romanian people of German descent
Association football midfielders
Liga I players
Liga II players
CAM Timișoara players
Colțea Brașov players
Unirea Tricolor București players
Olympia București players
Romania international footballers
1930 FIFA World Cup players
Romania national football team managers
Romanian football managers
FC UTA Arad managers
FCV Farul Constanța managers
FC Rapid București managers
CSM Ceahlăul Piatra Neamț managers
Romanian writers
20th-century Romanian writers
Romanian male writers
20th-century Romanian male writers